Dust bunnies (or dustbunnies) are small clumps of dust that form under furniture and in corners that are not cleaned regularly. They are made of hair, lint, flakes of dead skin, spider webs, dust, and sometimes light rubbish and debris and are held together by static electricity and felt-like entanglement. They can house dust mites or other parasites and can lower the efficiency of dust filters by clogging them. The movement of a single large particle can start the formation of a dust bunny.

Dust bunnies are harmful to electronics because they can obstruct air flow through heat sinks, raising temperatures significantly and therefore shortening the life of electronic components.

An American trademark for "Dustbunny" was registered in 2006 for the "Dustbunny Cleaner", a robotic ball with an electrostatic sleeve that rolls around under furniture to collect dust bunnies and other 

Dust bunnies have been used as an analogy for the accretion of cosmic matter in planetoids.

References

External links 
 

Cleaning
Dust
Waste